Zhang Shuguang (born December 1956) was the deputy chief engineer of the Ministry of Railways of China and the deputy chief designer of China's high-speed railway. Zhang was born in Shanghai but is considered a native of his ancestral home of Liyang, Jiangsu by Chinese convention.  He graduated from Lanzhou Railway University in 1982.

An associate of former Minister of Railways Liu Zhijun, Zhang was fired in February 2011 soon after Liu was arrested for corruption. He was given a suspended death sentence. Liu Zhijun had received the same sentence in 2013. Zhang's deputy Su Shunhu was also convicted of taking bribes and sentenced to life.

References

1956 births
Living people
Chinese people in rail transport
Chinese politicians convicted of corruption
Chinese prisoners sentenced to death
Chinese Communist Party politicians from Shanghai
Engineers from Shanghai
Expelled members of the Chinese Communist Party
Prisoners sentenced to death by the People's Republic of China